Samuel Stephens (1629–1669) was the Governor of the Albemarle colony (which would later become North Carolina) from 1667 until his death in late 1669. He was appointed by the Lords Proprietor to succeed William Drummond.

Early life and education
Stephens was born in Jamestown, Virginia and was the first governor of any colony to be born in America. His parents were Richard Stephens and Elizabeth Piersey Stephens.

In 1652, Stephens married Frances Culpepper, the sister of Lord John Culpeper. They had no children. They owned Boldrup Plantation.

Career
Before King Charles II of England established the Province of Carolina, Stephens had served as "Commander of the Southern Plantation" for the Colony of Virginia between 1662 and 1664.  The "Southern Plantation" roughly corresponded to what would later be northeastern North Carolina.

Death
Stephens died while serving as Governor.

References

External links
Biography at Carolana.com
North Carolina Manual of 1913

1629 births
1669 deaths
American colonial people
Colonial governors and administrators
Virginia colonial people
People from Jamestown, Virginia
People from Warwick County, Virginia